The Wheeler–DeWitt equation for theoretical physics and applied mathematics, is a field equation attributed to John Archibald Wheeler and Bryce DeWitt. The equation attempts to mathematically combine the ideas of quantum mechanics and general relativity, a step towards a theory of quantum gravity.

In this approach, time plays a role different from what it does in non-relativistic quantum mechanics, leading to the so-called 'problem of time'. More specifically, the equation describes the quantum version of the Hamiltonian constraint using metric variables. Its commutation relations with the diffeomorphism constraints generate the Bergman–Komar "group" (which is the diffeomorphism group on-shell).

Quantum gravity

All defined and understood descriptions of string/M-theory deal with fixed asymptotic conditions on the background spacetime.  At infinity, the "right" choice of the time coordinate "t" is determined (because the space-time is asymptotic to some fixed space-time) in every description, so there is a preferred definition of the Hamiltonian (with nonzero eigenvalues) to evolve states of the system forwards in time.  This avoids all the need to dynamically generate a time dimension using the Wheeler–DeWitt equation. Thus, the equation has not played a role in string theory thus far.

There could exist a Wheeler–DeWitt-style manner to describe the bulk dynamics of quantum theory of gravity. Some experts believe that this equation still holds the potential for understanding quantum gravity; however, decades after the equation was published, completely different approaches, such as string theory, have brought physicists as clear results about quantum gravity.

Motivation and background 
In canonical gravity, spacetime is foliated into spacelike submanifolds.

In that equation the Latin indices run over the values 1, 2, 3 and the Greek indices run over the values 1, 2, 3, 4. The Hamiltonian is a constraint (characteristic of most relativistic systems)

Quantization "puts hats" on the momenta and field variables; that is, the functions of numbers in the classical case become operators that modify the state function in the quantum case. Thus we obtain the operator

Working in "position space", these operators are

One can apply the operator to a general wave functional of the metric  where:

which would give a set of constraints amongst the coefficients . This means the amplitudes for  gravitons at certain positions is related to the amplitudes for a different number of gravitons at different positions.

Mathematical formalism 
The Wheeler–DeWitt equation is a functional differential equation. It is ill-defined in the general case, but very important in theoretical physics, especially in quantum gravity. It is a functional differential equation on the space of three dimensional spatial metrics. The Wheeler–DeWitt equation has the form of an operator acting on a wave functional; the functional reduces to a function in cosmology. Contrary to the general case, the Wheeler–DeWitt equation is well defined in minisuperspaces like the configuration space of cosmological theories. An example of such a wave function is the Hartle–Hawking state. Bryce DeWitt first published this equation in 1967 under the name "Einstein–Schrödinger equation"; it was later renamed the "Wheeler–DeWitt equation".

Hamiltonian constraint

Simply speaking, the Wheeler–DeWitt equation says

where  is the Hamiltonian constraint in quantized general relativity and  stands for the wave function of the universe. Unlike ordinary quantum field theory or quantum mechanics, the Hamiltonian is a first class constraint on physical states. We also have an independent constraint for each point in space.

Although the symbols  and  may appear familiar, their interpretation in the Wheeler–DeWitt equation is substantially different from non-relativistic quantum mechanics.   is no longer a spatial wave function in the traditional sense of a complex-valued function that is defined on a 3-dimensional space-like surface and normalized to unity. Instead it is a functional of field configurations on all of spacetime. This wave function contains all of the information about the geometry and matter content of the universe.  is still an operator that acts on the Hilbert space of wave functions, but it is not the same Hilbert space as in the nonrelativistic case, and the Hamiltonian no longer determines evolution of the system, so the Schrödinger equation  no longer applies. This property is known as timelessness. The reemergence of time requires the tools of decoherence and clock operators  (or the use of a scalar field).

Momentum constraint

We also need to augment the Hamiltonian constraint with momentum constraints

associated with spatial diffeomorphism invariance.

In minisuperspace approximations, we only have one Hamiltonian constraint (instead of infinitely many of them).

In fact, the principle of general covariance in general relativity implies that global evolution per se does not exist; the time  is just a label we assign to one of the coordinate axes. Thus, what we think about as time evolution of any physical system is just a gauge transformation, similar to that of QED induced by U(1) local gauge transformation  where  plays the role of local time. The role of a Hamiltonian is simply to restrict the space of the "kinematic" states of the Universe to that of "physical" states—the ones that follow gauge orbits. For this reason we call it a "Hamiltonian constraint." Upon quantization, physical states become wave functions that lie in the kernel of the Hamiltonian operator.

In general, the Hamiltonian vanishes for a theory with general covariance or time-scaling invariance.

See also

ADM formalism
Diffeomorphism constraint
Euclidean quantum gravity
Regge calculus
Canonical quantum gravity
Peres metric
Loop quantum gravity

References

 
 

Quantum gravity
Equations